Armaghan Shahid PP (born 27 April 1971), better known by his stage names Shaan Shahid or Shaan, is a Pakistani actor, producer, model, writer and director. Shaan has established himself as one of the most popular leading actors of Pakistan. 

Shaan started his acting career in 1990 by making his film debut in Javed Fazil's film Bulandi opposite Reema Khan and as of 2014 he has acted in 576 movies, including 388 Punjabi films and 188 Urdu films.

He has won many awards in Pakistan including one Pride of Performance, fifteen Nigar Awards, five Lux Style Awards, one Pakistan Media Award, ARY Film Award. 

He is considered the highest-paid film star in Pakistan.

Early life 
Armaghan Shahid, was born in Lahore to director Riaz Shahid and theatre, film and television actress Neelo. His father was a Punjabi Kashmiri and Muslim whereas his mother was a Punjabi Christian who embraced Islam. His paternal uncle Fiaz Shahid was a cameraman and producer for PTV in Islamabad. He has a younger brother, Sarosh Shahid who is also an actor and he has an older sister, Zarqa Shahid. 

He started his early education at the prestigious Aitchison College. His first acting venture came at a boy scout bonfire. He won the best actor award in a play called Alif Noon, playing a comedy character, but never took acting seriously as a career. After Aitchison, he left for New York, United States and joined Newtown High School. Dreaming of being a lawyer, he always thought he had the talent to become one. He stayed in New York for seven years, then returned to Pakistan for a vacation where he took up the family business, Riaz Shahid Films. At the age of 19, he acted in his first film, Bulandi, which was released in 1990.

Acting career

Early work

Shaan made his debut with Bulandi in 1990 opposite another debutante Reema Khan. He has since appeared in hundreds of Urdu and Punjabi language films.

In 2013, he starred in Bilal Lashari's Waar alongside Aisha Khan, Shamoon Abbasi, Uzma Khan, Ali Azmat, and Meesha Shafi. The film opened to positive reviews, and was Pakistan's highest anticipated film at that time. He won the Best actor Award of Viewer's choice at the 1st ARY Film Awards. After the success of Waar, he appeared in Jami & Summer Nicks's  O21 with a supporting cast of Aamina Sheikh, Iman Ali, Shamoon Abbasi and Ayub Khoso. In 2015, he starred in Hassan Rana's Yalghaar alongside Adnan Siddiqui, and the film was set to be the most expensive film in the history of Pakistani cinema with an estimated budget of Rs 50 crore.

He has done independent films as well such as the dance-based film Naach (2013) opposite Javed Sheikh, Momal Sheikh and newcomer Neil Uchong and Shahzad Rafique's punjabi romantic film Ishq Khuda alongside Saima, Ahsan Khan and Wiam Dahmani. Shaan has also sung a few songs in his films.

Directorial debut
Keen on making a difference to filmmaking in Pakistan, Shaan launched himself as a director. He directed his ambitious project Guns and Roses - Ik Junoon, which was released in 1999. The film was produced by the art entrepreneur Tanvir Fatima Rehman. He co-starred with Faisal Rehman, Meera and Resham. The music was scored by M. Arshad, the cinematography was done by Azhar Burki, and it was written by Pervaiz Kaleem. In 2000 he directed Mujhe Chand Chahiye starring himself, Noor, Reema Khan, Moammar Rana, Javed Sheikh and Atiqa Odho. He then directed Moosa Khan (2001), which starred him, Saima, Abid Ali, Jan Rambo and Noor. The film received genuinely positive reviews from critics.

He signed a three-film deal with actress Juggan Kazim in 2008. One film, titled Chup was under pre-production for several years until it was scrapped; the others are still in pre-production. He is working with screenwriter Mashal Peerzada and Pakistani television director and screenwriter Sarmad Sultan Khoosat for his film projects. In 2009, Shaan appeared on ARY Digital's show Happenings which showed him directing a film scene with actress Resham in a Haveli house. In the interview he confirmed he has been making a film, however, not much is known about it. In 2012, he announced that he is set to direct one film that stayed under production for several years, Mission Allahu Akbar opposite Juggan Kazim in Thailand. In 2013, Shaan said his films were on hold as he is involved in his other ambitious acting projects.

Television
Shaan joined Geo Television Network and hosted a morning show named Geo Shaan Say on Geo News. But he soon left the show to focus on the development of Lashari's Waar.

Brand Ambassador

Businesses
Shaan, with his extensive education and grooming and the ability to project class and elegance through his stature and expressions, has been a hot attraction for many brands and campaigns; several of them have had the pleasure of hosting him. On 17 February 2009, Unilever Pakistan launched their latest offering, the LUX Limited Edition soap, at the Pearl Continental Hotel in Lahore, Pakistan. Shaan endorsed another mega brand, Pepsi, where he and the singing sensation Ali Zafar helped strengthen the brand in Pakistan. Pakistan's telecom giant Mobilink hosted Shaan as a spokesperson for 'Mobilink Indigo', with the launch of the new face of Mobilink's premium post-paid brand 'Indigo' in 2004. It was projected as the brand for the elite executive and families. His character was a man whose demanding lifestyle has him juggling between work and family and Indigo helps him breeze through this life successfully.

Shaan was the Goodwill Ambassador for 'One Pack = One Vaccine', a campaign launched by UNICEF, Procter & Gamble and the Ministry of Health in a bid to eradicate tetanus from Pakistan. Shaan has committed himself to the cause and has been visiting many areas and cities across the country, including malls and stores in Karachi and Lahore, to bring awareness amongst parents, especially mothers, about this deadly disease and how one can fight to eliminate it.

Sports
Shaan has a great interest in sports. Shaan joined PSL franchise, Lahore Qalandars as brand ambassador ahead of the second season. After his venture at PSL, he was named the brand ambassador of Kashmir Premier League. In January 2021, he had been named as the brand ambassador for Punjab Sports Board.

Personal life

Relationships & family 
He married Amina Shaan and has four daughters:  Bahisht-i-Bareen Shaan Shahid, Fatima Shahid, Shah Bano Shahid, and Raanay Shahid.

Filmography

Films

Awards and nominations 
 Government of Pakistan's Pride of Performance Award (2007)
 15 Nigar Awards
 5 Lux Style Awards
 4 National Film Awards
 Shaan won Best Film Hero on 2nd Pakistan Media Award (2011)

Nigar Awards

Lux Style Awards

Ary Films Awards

See also 
 List of Pakistani actors

References

External links 
 , Retrieved 21 September 2015

Aitchison College alumni
1971 births
Living people
Film directors from Lahore
Pakistani male film actors
Recipients of the Pride of Performance
Nigar Award winners
Punjabi people
Pakistani people of Kashmiri descent
Geo News newsreaders and journalists
Male actors from Lahore
Pakistani expatriates in the United States
Newtown High School alumni
People from Lahore